Harpocrates (Phoenician: 𐤇𐤓𐤐𐤊𐤓𐤈, romanized: ḥrpkrṭ,   harpokrates) was the god of silence, secrets and confidentiality in the Hellenistic religion developed in Ptolemaic Alexandria (and also an embodiment of hope, according to Plutarch). Harpocrates was adapted by the Greeks from the Egyptian child god Horus, who represented the newborn sun, rising each day at dawn. Harpocrates's name was a Hellenization of the Egyptian Har-pa-khered or Heru-pa-khered, meaning "Horus the Child". Horus is represented as a naked boy with his finger to his mouth, a realisation of the hieroglyph for "child" (𓀔). Misunderstanding this gesture, the later Greeks and Roman poets made Harpocrates the god of silence and secrecy.

Horus

In Egyptian mythology, Horus was the child of Isis and Osiris. Osiris was the original divine pharaoh of Egypt, who had been murdered by his brother Set (by interpretatio graeca, identified with Typhon or Chaos), mummified, and thus became the god of the underworld. The Greeks melded Osiris with their underworldly Hades to produce the essentially Alexandrian syncretism known as Serapis.

Among the Egyptians, the full-grown Horus was considered the victorious god of the sun who each day overcomes darkness. He is often represented with the head of a Eurasian sparrowhawk, which was sacred to him, as the hawk flies high above the Earth. Horus fought battles against Set, until he finally achieved victory and became the ruler of Egypt. Thereafter, the pharaohs of Egypt were seen as reincarnations of the victorious Horus.

"Horus on the Crocodiles" steles depicting Heru-pa-Khered standing on the back of a crocodile and holding snakes in his outstretched hands were erected in Egyptian temple courtyards, where they would be immersed or lustrated (purified) in water; the water was then used for blessing and healing purposes as the name of Heru-pa-Khered was itself attributed with many protective and healing powers.

In the Alexandrian and Roman renewed vogue for the Greco-Roman mysteries at the turn of the millennium into the common era — mystery cults had already existed for centuries — the worship of Horus became widely extended, linked with his mother Isis and his father Serapis.

In this way Harpocrates, the child Horus, personifies the newborn sun each day, the first strength of the winter sun, and also the image of early vegetation. Egyptian statues represent the child Horus, pictured as a naked boy with his finger on his chin with the fingertip just below the lips of his mouth, a realization of the hieroglyph for "child" that is unrelated to the Greco-Roman and modern gesture for "silence". Misunderstanding this sign, the later Greeks and Roman poets made Harpocrates the god of silence and secrecy, taking their cue from Marcus Terentius Varro, who asserted in De lingua Latina of Caelum (Sky) and Terra (Earth).

Ovid described Isis:

One other tale relates the story about the Greek gods. Aphrodite gave a rose to her son Eros, the god of love; he, in turn, gave it to Harpocrates to ensure that his mother's indiscretions (or those of the gods in general, in other accounts) were kept under wraps. This gave roses the connotation of secrecy (a rose suspended from the ceiling of a council chamber pledged all present – sub rosa "under the rose"), which continued through the Middle Ages and through the modern era.

Inexpensive cast terracotta images of Harpocrates, suitable for house shrines, are found scattered throughout the Roman Empire. Thus Augustine of Hippo was aware of the iconic gesture of Harpocrates:

Martianus Capella, author of an allegorizing textbook that remained a standard through the Middle Ages recognized the image of the "boy with his finger pressed to his lips" but neglected to mention Harpocrates' name: "[Q]uidam redimitus puer ad os compresso digito salutari silentium commonebat". The boy was identified, however, as Cupid in glosses, a syncresis that had already resulted in the figure of Harpocratic Cupid.

Plutarch wrote that Harpocrates was the second son of Isis and that he was born prematurely with lame legs. Horus the Child  became the special protector of children and their mothers. As he was healed of a poisonous snake bite by Ra he became a symbol of hope in the gods looking after suffering humanity.

Another solar cult, not directly connected with Harpocrates, was that of Sol Invictus "the Unconquered Sun".

20th century reference
From the 1920s through the 1950s, Harpo Marx performed pantomime and wore either a curly red or curly blonde wig in character. His brother Groucho jokingly said he named himself in honour of Harpocrates, as a god of both silence and childhood, or childish joy. In truth he was named Harpo because he played the harp.

Modern occultist uses
Modern occultists display his image, loosely connected now with Hermetic gnosticism. Typically, "Harpocrates is the Babe in the Egg of Blue that sits upon the lotus flower in the Nile". He may be termed the 'god of silence' and said to represent the higher self and be the 'holy guardian angel' and more in similar vein, adapted from Aleister Crowley's often-reprinted Magick.

Many Discordians consider Harpo Marx to have been a contemporary avatar of Harpocrates. Because of this, Discordians often invoke Harpocrates as a trickster god or god of humor in addition to his classical attribution of god of silence.

Cultural uses

Roses, a symbol strongly associated with Harpocrates, can sometimes be seen painted or else plastered upon borders around the ceilings of rooms intended for the receiving of guests (dining rooms, parlours, etc.), as a sign that topics discussed within the room are not to be discussed or else repeated outside of the room and other outside parties. Similarly, roses may be placed over confessionals to symbolize confidentiality.

Archaeology

In 2018, archaeologists discovered a bone statuette depicting the god dating back to the 1st century BC. In addition to the god, two satyrs and a goose are depicted. It was discovered during excavations at the ancient Greek city of Tiritaka at Crimea. A statue of Harpocrates was also found in Faw, Saudi Arabia dating to the Kingdom of Kinda of late antiquity.

In popular culture
Harpocrates plays a major role in Rick Riordan's The Trials of Apollo series. He is used by the Roman emperors Caligula, Commodus and Nero – all now minor gods – to block demigod communications throughout the events of the series. In The Tyrant's Tomb, he is freed by protagonists Apollo, Reyna Ramírez-Arellano and Meg McCaffrey. Harpocrates wills himself out of existence alongside the Sibylline Oracle and his last breath is used in a ritual to summon Diana for help against the undead forces of Tarquin. Harpocrates's death restores all forms of communication as well, although a month later in The Tower of Nero it's mentioned that communication is still spotty and slowly returning to normal.

See also
 Elpis, Greek goddess of Hope.
 Fides, Roman goddess of trust and confidentiality.

References

 Franz Cumont, The Oriental Religions in Roman Paganism, Dover Publications, 1956.
 Harry Thurston Peck, Harper's Dictionary of Classical Antiquities, 1898: "Harpocrates."
 David Sacks, Language Visible: Unraveling the Mystery of the Alphabet, Random House 2003.

Further reading

External links

 Theoi Project: Harpocrates
 A brief definition
 Iconography of Harpocrates (PDF-article)
 

Greek gods
Hellenistic Egyptian deities
Horus
Solar gods